Portrayal of Guilt is an American hardcore punk band formed in Austin, Texas in 2017. It was founded by guitarist/vocalist Matt King, bassist Blake Given, and drummer James Beveridge.

History 
Portrayal of Guilt formed when guitarist and vocalist Matt King and drummer James Beveridge – members of Austin hardcore band Illustrations – joined forces with bassist Blake Given of Austin screamo outfit Lyed. The trio released their self-titled EP in May 2017, and toured extensively across the United States and Europe with Centuries, Majority Rule, Planning for Burial, Street Sects, and Slow Fire Pistol. 

In March 2018, they released a split EP with industrial hardcore band Street Sects, who they had previously toured with, to critical acclaim. In this same month, Deathwish Inc. reissued their self-titled 7".

In July 2018, just before embarking on a full U.S. tour with French post-hardcore stalwarts Birds in Row, the band released a single-sided 5" single containing the song "Chamber of Misery (Pt. 1)" as the beginning of a campaign to support first their full-length, studio album. The album's name, Let Pain Be Your Guide, was announced on September 6th of the same year, along with the premiere of the single "A Burden." On October 1st, they premiered the second single from the album, "Your War," which featured vocals from Dylan Walker of Full of Hell. On October 24th they released the last single from the record, "Among Friends." On November 12th, the full album was made available to listen to via NPR. The album features artwork by Chris Taylor of Pg. 99 and Pygmy Lush, as well as additional vocals from Maha Shami of NØ MAN and Matt Michel of Majority Rule. On November 18th, Let Pain Be Your Guide was released in full, largely to critical acclaim.

In February 2019, Portrayal of Guilt was featured in The Washington Post, along with contemporaries Vein and Infant Island, as delivering "new life" to screamo. 

In 2019, Portrayal of Guilt continued touring in support of their full length, opening for Pg. 99, Majority Rule, The HIRS Collective, and Wrong. They also headlined a full U.S. tour with support from Fluoride, NØ MAN, and Stay Asleep. In February 2019 it was announced that the band would be opening for Skeletonwitch on a number of dates across the American South.

On January 29, 2021, Portrayal of Guilt released their second album We Are Always Alone on Closed Casket Activities, a Troy, New York based metal label.

Musical style 
Portrayal of Guilt's musical style has been described as screamo since the band's inception as the band openly draws from older bands in the genre like Pg.99 and City of Caterpillar – even enlisting Matt Michel, the frontman of Majority Rule to record, mix, and produce their first record, Let Pain Be Your Guide. They have been compared to the bands Converge and Oathbreaker, and termed "blackened screamo."

Band members
Current members
 Matt King – vocals, guitar (2017–present)
 Alex Stanfield – bass (2019–present)
 James Beveridge – drums (2017–present)

Past members
 Blake Given – bass (2017–2019)
 Rick Flores – electronics, sampling (2017–2019)

Discography

Studio albums

Extended plays

Singles

References 

Musical groups established in 2017
Musical groups from Austin, Texas
Punk rock groups from Texas
American screamo musical groups
American grindcore musical groups
2017 establishments in Texas